The Still Tide are an American indie rock band from Brooklyn, New York. They are currently based in Denver, Colorado.

History
The Still Tide originally was known as Yet Cut Breath before changing their name. The Still Tide used Kickstarter to record and release their first full-length album titled Tinder in June 2013. In 2015, the band released an EP titled Half Empty Rooms. In 2017, the band released another EP titled Run Out.

Band members
Anna Morsett (guitar/vocals) 
Jake Miller (guitar) 
Joe Richmond (drums)
Nate Meese (bass)

Discography
Studio albums
Tinder (2013)
EPs
Half Empty Rooms (2015)
Run Out (2017)
Each, After (2018)
Between Skies (2020)

References

Indie rock musical groups from New York (state)
Musical groups from Brooklyn